Fernando San Isidro (born 8 March 1951) is a Spanish wrestler. He competed in the men's Greco-Roman 82 kg at the 1980 Summer Olympics.

References

1951 births
Living people
Spanish male sport wrestlers
Olympic wrestlers of Spain
Wrestlers at the 1980 Summer Olympics
Place of birth missing (living people)